The Kazarman hydropower cascade is a future hydropower project near Kazarman in Jalal-Abad Region, Kyrgyzstan. When completed, it will consist of 4 hydropower plants on the river Naryn: Ala-Buga, Kara-Bulung-1, Kara-Bulung-2 and Toguz-Toro, with a total installed capacity of 1160 MW.

References

Hydroelectric power stations in Kyrgyzstan
Proposed hydroelectric power stations
Proposed renewable energy power stations in Kyrgyzstan